Meshginshahr (also Romanized as Meshgīn Shahr; also known as Meshkīn Shahr or simply Mishgin; formerly Khiav, also Romanized as Kheyāv, Khīāv, Khiov, Khīyāv, and Khiyov) is a city in the Central District of Meshgin Shahr County, Ardabil province, Iran, and serves as the county's capital.

At the 2006 census, its population was 61,296 in 14,920 households. The following census in 2011 counted 66,883 people in 17,871 households. The latest census in 2016 showed a population of 74,109 people in 21,926 households.

History 
The 14th-century author Hamdallah Mustawfi mentioned the city, as Khiyāv, as one of the seven cities in the tuman of Pishkin, or Mishkin. He distinguished between the cities of Khiyav and Pishkin — according to him, Khiyav lay to the south of Mount Sablan and had a warm climate, while Pishkin (which he said had formerly been called "Varāvī") was to the north of Mount Sablan and had a damp climate because the mountain shielded it from the sun. Both cities drew their water from the streams coming down from the mountain. The district of Pishkin, he wrote, grew both grain and fruit in abundance, while Khiyav mostly grew grain. Pishkin was assessed for a tax value of 5,200 dinars, while Khiyav was assessed at 2,000. Mustawfi wrote that Pishkin's population was mostly Shafi'i Sunnis, with Shi'i and Hanafi Sunni minorities. He said nothing about Khiyav's religious makeup, but instead described its population as mostly "boot-makers and cloth-workers".

References

Sources

External links
Meshgin Shahr Tourism Website
Meshgin Shahr Municipality Website
Meshgin Shahr Government Website
Meshgin Shahr Travel Guide

Meshgin Shahr County

Cities in Ardabil Province

Towns and villages in Meshgin Shahr County

Populated places in Ardabil Province

Populated places in Meshgin Shahr County